MCPD may refer to:

 3-MCPD, a toxic by-product of acid-hydrolyzed soy sauce 
 Maui County Police Department
 Microsoft Certified Professional Developer
 Montgomery County Police Department, the primary law enforcement agency for Montgomery County, Maryland
 Multi-Crop Passport Descriptor, an international standard to facilitate germplasm passport information exchange
 Mixopolis City Police Department, the police tribe from the TV series Mixels